Inside The Forbidden City is a 1965 Hong Kong Huangmei opera musical film. Depicted is the famous tale known as "Civet for Crown Prince" which allegedly took place in China's Song Dynasty.

Synopsis 
While passing through the town of Caoqiao, the famous Song Dynasty official Bao Zheng is stopped by a villager on behalf of his blind mother. Bao discovers that the blind woman was Consort Li, a concubine of the late Emperor Zhenzong.

Twenty years ago, right after Li gave birth to a son, a jealous rival Consort Liu conspired with eunuch Guo Huai to have the infant swapped with a dead civet. She then ordered her maid Kou Zhu to throw the baby into the river. At the Jinshui Bridge, a hesitant Kou was approached by eunuch Chen Lin. Chen was able to carry the infant to Eighth Imperial Prince, one of Zhenzong's brothers, who raised the baby as one of his own. Eventually the baby became crown prince as Zhenzong had no other sons.

As a result of giving birth to a monster, Li was banished to Yu Chen Palace, while Liu was elevated to the status of Empress. One day, the 10-year-old crown prince wandered to the forbidden palace and met Li. Liu came upon them and became suspicious. She convinced Zhenzong that Li was cursed and needed to be burned to death along with her palace. Kou ran off to warn Li and was interrogated harshly when she returned. After Kou killed herself by slamming into a pillar, Guo and the soldiers went to Yu Chen Palace to carry out the burning order, when they saw a hanged body with Li's clothing. Unbeknownst to them, eunuch Yu Zhong had sacrificed himself, allowing Li to escape.

The crown prince had become Emperor Renzong, and Bao uses the Lantern Festival for an opportunity to tell him the story. Then, Bao tricks Guo to the Kaifeng court but Guo stubbornly refuses to confess. Playing on Guo's fear of the supernatural, Bao invokes the "Ghost of Kou Zhu" to finally get a confession. Liu is ordered to commit suicide while Renzong welcomes his mother back to the palace.

Cast
 Ivy Ling Po as Kou Zhu
 Cheng Miu as Bao Zheng
 Go Bo-shu as Consort Liu
 Ouyang Sha-fei as Consort Li
 Chan Yau-san as Guo Huai
 Goo Man-chung as Chen Lin
 Chin Feng as Emperor Zhenzong of Song & Emperor Renzong of Song
 Yeung Chi-hing as Eighth Prince
 Chan Wan-ma as Princess Di
 Tien Feng as Pang Ji
 Fan Dan as Bao Xing
 Fung Ngai as Wang Chao
 Kwan Yan as Ma Han
 Tsui Kwan-sang as Zhang Long
 Wong Nin as Zhao Hu
 Fuk Yan-cheng as Qin Feng
 Lee Ching as Ghost of Kou Zhu

Huangmei opera dubbing 
 Ivy Ling Po as Kou Zhu
 Tsui Ping as Consort Li
 Kiang Hung as Bao Zheng

References

External links 

1965 films
1960s Mandarin-language films
Fictional depictions of Bao Zheng in film
Hong Kong musical films
Shaw Brothers Studio films
1965 musical films
Gong'an fiction
Films based on The Seven Heroes and Five Gallants
Huangmei opera films
Films directed by Kao Li